Bikramkumar Das (born 15 November 1999) is an Indian cricketer. He made his List A debut for Tripura in the 2016–17 Vijay Hazare Trophy on 25 February 2017. He made his first-class debut on 9 December 2019, for Tripura in the 2019–20 Ranji Trophy. He made his Twenty20 debut on 4 November 2021, for Tripura in the 2021–22 Syed Mushtaq Ali Trophy.

References

External links
 

1999 births
Living people
Indian cricketers
Tripura cricketers
Place of birth missing (living people)